Dušan Pantelić (born 15 April 1993) is a Serbian football midfielder who plays for Bosnian club Tuzla City.

Career 
Pantelić signed a contract with PAS Giannina on 20 January 2019. He released on a free transfer on 31 August 2019. He signed a contract with FK Radnički Niš.

On 9 July 2021, he signed a one-season contract with Honvéd in Hungary.

On 29 July 2022, Pantelić signed a three-year contract with Bosnian club Tuzla City.

References

External links
 
 Dušan Pantelić stats at utakmica.rs 
 

1993 births
Sportspeople from Kragujevac
Living people
Serbian footballers
Association football midfielders
FK Rad players
FK Palić players
OFK Mladenovac players
FK Srem Jakovo players
FK Teleoptik players
FK Voždovac players
FK Napredak Kruševac players
FK Bežanija players
FK Novi Pazar players
FK Radnik Surdulica players
PAS Giannina F.C. players
FK Radnički Niš players
Budapest Honvéd FC players
FK Tuzla City players
Serbian First League players
Serbian SuperLiga players
Super League Greece players
Nemzeti Bajnokság I players
Premier League of Bosnia and Herzegovina players
Serbian expatriate footballers
Expatriate footballers in Greece
Serbian expatriate sportspeople in Greece
Expatriate footballers in Hungary
Serbian expatriate sportspeople in Hungary
Expatriate footballers in Bosnia and Herzegovina
Serbian expatriate sportspeople in Bosnia and Herzegovina